912 Maritima is an asteroid in the asteroid belt. Based on lightcurve studies observing Maritima over a three-month period, Maritima has a rotation period of 1332 hours. Superslow rotators, those with periods longer than a few days, are generally small asteroids. The current paradigm is that slowing of an asteroid's spin rate is the result of YORP radiation pressure, which acts on the target as the inverse square of its size and the inverse of its semi-major axis. The rotation period is less than conclusive.

References

External links 
 Lightcurve plot of 912 Maritima, Palmer Divide Observatory, B. D. Warner (2005)
 Asteroid Lightcurve Database (LCDB), query form (info )
 Dictionary of Minor Planet Names, Google books
 Asteroids and comets rotation curves, CdR – Observatoire de Genève, Raoul Behrend
 Discovery Circumstances: Numbered Minor Planets (1)-(5000) – Minor Planet Center
 
 

000912
Discoveries by Friedrich Karl Arnold Schwassmann
Named minor planets
000912
000912
19190427